Midwestern, Midwest, Upper North, or Upper Northern English dialects or accents are associated with the Midwestern region of the United States. These include:
 General American, the most widely perceived "mainstream" American English accent is sometimes considered "Midwestern" in character, prior to the Northern Cities Vowel Shift.
 Inland Northern American English is often generally recognized as a Cleveland, Chicago, or Detroit accent, or the accent of western New York State (Buffalo, Rochester, Syracuse, etc.).
 Midland American English is often generally recognized as a Columbus, Indianapolis, and Kansas City accent. According to William Labov, "North Midland" is the General American standard.
 North-Central American English is often generally recognized as a Minnesota, Wisconsin, Iowa, or Dakota accent.

American English
Midwestern United States